"I Guess It Never Hurts to Hurt Sometimes" is a song written and originally recorded by Randy VanWarmer on his 1981 album Beat of Love. It was later covered by American country music group The Oak Ridge Boys in 1984, released as the second single from their album Deliver.  The song was The Oak Ridge Boys' ninth number one on the country chart.  The single went to number one for one week and spent a total of twelve weeks on the country chart.

Background
Songwriter Randy VanWarmer wrote the song following the death of his father. While The Oak Ridge Boys' music video depicts a lost girlfriend, tenor singer Joe Bonsall says he prefers the original intent of the song, and names the song as his favorite to sing on stage.

Music video
The music video was filmed at the old WSM Radio studios in Nashville, Tennessee. Radio and TV personality Charlie Chase (half of the duo Crook & Chase) makes a brief cameo walking through the station hallways. The disc jockey and the end of the video is played by future country music artist Lorrie Morgan.

Charts

Weekly charts

Year-end charts

References

1984 singles
Randy VanWarmer songs
The Oak Ridge Boys songs
Songs written by Randy VanWarmer
Song recordings produced by Ron Chancey
MCA Records singles
1981 songs